Naseh-ye Mur-e Gham (also Romanized as Naseh-ye Mūr-e Gham; also known as Naseh) is a village in Zilayi Rural District, Margown District, Boyer-Ahmad County, Kohgiluyeh and Boyer-Ahmad Province, Iran. At the 2006 census, its population was 165, in 33 families.

References 

Populated places in Boyer-Ahmad County